Herbert A. Jacobs (April 8, 1903 – May 20, 1987) was a journalist for the Milwaukee Journal and later a professor of journalism at the University of California, Berkeley.

Houses

Jacobs was a friend of Frank Lloyd Wright. Jacobs and his wife Katherine commissioned Wright to design a house for them. This house, the Herbert and Katherine Jacobs First House, was notable as the first example of Usonian architecture.

Later, they commissioned Wright to design another house for them, the Herbert and Katherine Jacobs Second House.

Jacobs method for crowd size estimation
Jacobs worked for the Milwaukee Journal from 1931 until 1936, then for Madison's Capital Times. After retirement in 1962, he taught journalism at the University of California, Berkeley.

Jacobs was present in Berkeley during the Berkeley riots. It was at this time that he devised a method for measuring crowd size, the Jacobs Method:

[Jacobs's] office was in a tower that overlooked the plaza where students frequently gathered to protest the Vietnam War. The plaza was marked with regular grid lines, which allowed Jacobs to see how many grid squares were filled with students and how many students on average packed into each grid. After gathering data on numerous demonstrations, Jacobs came up with some rules of thumb that still are used today by those serious about crowd estimation. A loose crowd, one where each person is an arm's length from the body of his or her nearest neighbors, needs 10 square feet per person. A more tightly packed crowd fills 4.5 square feet per person. A truly scary mob of mosh-pit density would get about 2.5 square feet per person.

Death
Herbet Jacobs died of cancer on May 20, 1987.

Notes and references

Notes

References

1903 births
1987 deaths
Crowd psychology
20th-century American non-fiction writers
20th-century American journalists
American male journalists
Milwaukee Journal Sentinel people
University of California, Berkeley faculty